Chengyang may refer to the following locations in China:

Chengyang District (城阳区), Qingdao, Shandong
Chengyang, Guangxi (程阳), scenic area in Sanjiang County, Guangxi
Chengyang, Ju County (城阳镇), town in Ju County, Shandong
Chengyang, Pengyang (城阳乡), a township in Pengyang County, Ningxia